The 1980 Tour du Haut Var was the 12th edition of the Tour du Haut Var cycle race and was held on 24 February 1980. The race started in Nice and finished in Seillans. The race was won by Pascal Simon.

General classification

References

1980
1980 in road cycling
1980 in French sport